Vortigern and Rowena, or Vortigern, an Historical Play, is a play that was touted as a newly discovered work by William Shakespeare when it first appeared in 1796. It was eventually revealed to be a Shakespeare hoax, the product of prominent forger William Henry Ireland and part of his wider series of forgeries. Its first performance was on 2 April 1796, when it was ridiculed by the audience. Its titular protagonists, Vortigern and Rowena, are figures from Britain's traditional history.

History

Ireland had produced several earlier documents he claimed represented the writings of Shakespeare, but Vortigern and Rowena was the first play he attempted. He shortly followed it with a forged Henry II. He had announced his "discovery" of the lost play as early as 26 December 1794 but did not show his father a manuscript until March 1795. He also provided a purported correspondence between Shakespeare and a printer explaining why the play was unpublished, as well as a deed accounting for how it came to be in hands of the Irelands. According to the deed, Shakespeare had willed all the manuscripts to an ancestor of the Irelands, also named William Henry Ireland, who had saved him from drowning. Years later, Ireland explained that he came up with this story to establish his right to the manuscripts in case a descendant of the bard might claim them.

Hearing of a newly recovered "lost" Shakespeare play, Irish playwright Richard Brinsley Sheridan purchased the rights to the first production at Drury Lane Theatre in London for 300 pounds and the promise of half the revenues to Ireland's family. After reading the play, Sheridan noted its relative simplicity compared to Shakespeare's known works. Actor John Philip Kemble, the manager of Drury Lane, who would play the title role in the play's only production, had serious doubts about Vortigerns authenticity.  Kemble's sister, Sarah Siddons, who had been cast as the title female role, dropped out one week before the scheduled opening for unknown reasons, though it is suspected that Kemble had successfully turned the famous actress against the work as well. Irish Shakespearean scholar Edmond Malone published An Inquiry into the Authenticity of Certain Miscellaneous Papers and Legal Instruments on 21 March 1796, about the authenticity of Vortigern and the other documents "discovered" by Ireland. Siddons' role of Edmunda was taken by Mrs Powell when it opened on 2 April 1796. The play did have its supporters; Henry James Pye and James Bland Burgess wrote prologues for it, while Robert Merry wrote an epilogue.

When Vortigern and Rowena opened on 2 April 1796 Kemble used the chance to hint at his opinion by repeating Vortigern's line "and when this solemn mockery is o'er," and the play was derided by the audience. It was not performed again until 2008. Some early critics accused William Henry Ireland's father Samuel of the forgery, though William assumed responsibility in two printed confessions. Samuel himself continued to regard the play as authentic and edited it in 1799, including a foreword in which he attacked Malone's findings and denounced the "illiberal and injurious treatment" he had received. Nevertheless, neither Ireland's reputation recovered from the fiasco, and William eventually moved to France, where he lived for several decades. He tried to publish Vortigern and Rowena as his own work when he returned to England in 1832, but met with little success.

Characters

 Constantius – King of Britain
 Aurelius – A Brother of Constantius
 Uter – A Brother of Constantius
 Vortigern – Adviser to Constantius
 Wortimerus – A Son of Vortigern
 Catagrinus – A Son of Vortigern
 Pascentius – A Son of Vortigern
 Hengist – Leader of the Saxon Mercenaries
 Horsus – Brother of Hengist
 Fool
 Servant
 Page
 Barons, Officers, Guards, &c., &c.
 Edmunda – Wife of Vortigern
 Flavia – Daughter of Vortigern, Ambrosius' Lover
 Rowena – Daughter of Hengist
 Attendants on Edmunda

Original cast
The original 1796 Drury Lane cast included John Philip Kemble as Vortigern, Robert Bensley as Constantius, William Barrymore as Aurelius, Thomas Caulfield as Uter, John Whitfield as Wortimerus, Charles Kemble as Pascentius, Thomas King as Fool, Vincent De Camp as Servant, Dorothea Jordan as Flavia, Jane Powell as Edmunda, Charlotte Tidswell and Elizabeth Heard as attendants. Charles Dignum, George Frederick Cooke, Samuel Thomas Russell and John Hayman Packer appeared in additional roles of the entertainment.

Synopsis

The story begins as the King of the Britons Constantius offers half his crown to his adviser Vortigern for his loyal service. Vortigern immediately plots the king's murder in order to take the crown for himself. Meanwhile, the court Fool warns two of Vortigern's children, Pascentius and Flavia, of the bad times ahead and the three of them leave the court with Flavia in drag. Constantius' sons Aurelius (Ambrosius Aurelianus) and Uter (Uther Pendragon), studying in Rome, receive word of Vortigern's treachery and go to Scotland to raise an army against their father's killer. In response Vortigern summons an army of Saxons, led by Hengist and Horsus, to defend him from the Scots. He falls in love with Hengist's beautiful daughter Rowena, and proclaims her his queen, much to the chagrin of his wife Edmunda and his two remaining sons, Wortimerus (Vortimer) and Catagrinus (Catigern), who flee. Vortigern's family eventually all join Aurelius and Uter's army, and Aurelius and Flavia declare their mutual love. In the end the Saxons are routed and Aurelius defeats Vortigern but spares his life, and then marries Flavia. The final speech is delivered by the Fool, who admits that the play is not very tragic, as "none save bad do fall, which draws no tear".

Sources
Like other apocryphal plays attributed to Shakespeare, The Birth of Merlin and Locrine, Vortigern and Rowena takes the Matter of Britain as its subject, drawing especially from Geoffrey of Monmouth's Historia Regum Britanniae and Raphael Holinshed's Chronicle, the same source used by Shakespeare. Shakespeare used Britain's mythical history in several of his plays, including King Lear and Cymbeline, based on the stories of Leir of Britain and Cunobelinus, respectively.  The play is essentially a pastiche of Shakespeare, with Vortigern serving as a Macbeth figure; other Shakespearean elements include the use of Holinshead and Flavia's cross-dressing.

Modern revival
The play experienced a comedic revival by the Pembroke Players at the Pembroke College New Cellars, Cambridge, on 19 November 2008. The production was directed by Pembroke third-year Alexander Whiscombe, and starred David Harrap in the title role with Eystein Thanisch as Aurelius. The American Shakespeare Center in Staunton, Virginia included the play as part of its Staged Reading Series in November 2013.

Notes

References
 The Camelot Project at the University of Rochester.
 Ireland, William Henry (1796). Authentic Account of the Shaksperian Manuscripts. Retrieved May 28, 2009.
 Ireland, William Henry (1805). The Confessions of William Henry Ireland. Reprinted 2001. Elibron Classics. .
 Ireland, William Henry. Vortigern, an Historical Play. From Vortigernstudies.org.uk. Retrieved May 26, 2007.
 
 Lacy, Norris J. (1991). The New Arthurian Encyclopedia. New York: Garland. .
 Stewart, Doug (2010). The Boy Who Would Be Shakespeare: A Tale of Forgery and Folly. Cambridge, MA: Da Capo Press. .

External links
 William Henry Ireland's Shakespeare Forgeries
 Camelot Project: Text of the Play
 Allpoetry: Text of the Play

1796 plays
Arthurian theatre
British plays
West End plays
Shakespeare apocrypha
Literary forgeries